Raúl Saucedo (born 12 September 1904, date of death unknown) was an Argentine fencer. He competed at the 1932, 1936 and 1948 Summer Olympics.

References

External links
 

1904 births
Year of death missing
Argentine male fencers
Olympic fencers of Argentina
Fencers at the 1932 Summer Olympics
Fencers at the 1936 Summer Olympics
Fencers at the 1948 Summer Olympics
People from Posadas, Misiones
Pan American Games medalists in fencing
Pan American Games gold medalists for Argentina
Pan American Games silver medalists for Argentina
Fencers at the 1951 Pan American Games
Sportspeople from Misiones Province